Jaijit Bhattacharya is an Indian entrepreneur and academician. He is the Founder and President of the Centre for Digital Economy Policy Research (C-DEP) and Founder and CEO of Zerone Microsystems Pvt. Ltd., a financial technology firm.

Career 
He previously worked in senior roles in Accenture, IBM, Oracle, Sun Microsystems and HP and has been the Founding Partner of Catalyst Constellations LLP.

Academic contributions 
Jaijit Bhattacharya is in the Board of Directors of IIM Calcutta Innovation Park and is drafting the chapter on Digital Vision 2035. Bhattacharya contributed to national initiatives such as Restructuring of the Indian Airforce based on the Shekatkar Committee report, Ranking of States on Ease of Doing Business by DIPP, conceptualization of Smart Cities by Ministry of Urban Development, Hriday initiative, ADB led Multi-modal Logistics Parks, including in Jogighopa in Assam, creating the Smart City Plan for New Delhi Municipal Council, Programme Management for development of a Comprehensive Integrated Master Plan for the Four Industrial Nodes of the VCIC, Regulatory and Financial Due-diligence of education initiatives submitted to Ministry of Human Resources Development, Government of India, Program Management Unit for Swachh Bharat Mission (Urban), plan and strategy for rollout of unnat chulha (improved cookstove) in rural India for MNRE (funded by GIZ) etc. Bhattacharya has been part of the World Bank initiative of South-Asian Digital connectivity on areas of education, healthcare and e-governance.

He contributed to the National policy on Open Standards that took six years to formulate, for which the Secretary, Ministry of Communications and IT suo moto sent a letter of appreciation. He believes that control over standards is critical to avoid Digital Colonization.

He is also a key author of the report "India Soars High" that compiled the initiatives of the government from an investor's perspective. The same was launched by the Honourable Prime Minister, Shri Narendra Modi as part of the Make in India programme launch.

Bhattacharya advises governments on e-governance strategies. He has conducted training for ADB institute in Tokyo on Public Expenditure Management and has helped World Bank develop curriculum for their e-Leadership program.

He also delivers invited lectures at INSEAD Singapore campus, IIT Roorkee and at IIM Calcutta.

References

1972 births
Living people
Indian economists